Canadians for Justice and Peace in the Middle East (CJPME) is a pan-Canadian grassroots advocacy organization established under a different name in 2002 in order to "empower Canadians of all backgrounds to promote justice, development and peace in the Middle East, and at home in Canada". Specifically, it seeks to achieve these goals through the creation of a Palestinian state, as well as by encouraging Canadian citizens to ensure that their government lives up to what the CJPME see as its legal and moral responsibilities in upholding human rights and humanitarian law both in Canada and internationally. For example, in November 2011 it criticised the Canadian government for not condemning the Israeli government's plan to expand a number of its settlements, which are considered illegal under international law as interpreted by the International Court of Justice.

It adopted its current name in 2004.

References

External links
 CJPME official site

Political advocacy groups in Canada